Doridomorphidae is a taxonomic family of colorful sea slugs or nudibranchs. They are marine gastropod molluscs.

Genera 
Genera and species within the family Doridomorphidae include:
Doridoeides
Doridoeides gardineri Eliot & Evans, 1908
Doridomorpha
Doridomorpha gardineri Eliot, 1906

References

 
Taxa named by Ernst Marcus (zoologist)
Taxa named by Eveline Du Bois-Reymond Marcus